Mark Harman may refer to:

 Mark Harman (translator) (born 1951), Irish-American translator
 Mark Harman (computer scientist), British computer scientist
 Mark Harman (cricketer) (born 1964), English cricketer

See also 
 Mark Harmon (born 1951), American actor
Mark Harmon (musician), American record producer, songwriter, and bass guitarist